MILI also known as Mili Nair (born 7 April) is a singer, songwriter from India. She released her debut album Written in the Stars where she composed all ten songs on the album. From writing her music and lending her voice to some of the biggest brand campaigns in advertising she has also recorded music with composers like A.R. Rahman, Amit Trivedi.

Biography

Early life 
Mili was born in Mumbai and studied in Pune and Bangalore. Her journey into music began at an early age and she confesses she knew right from the very start that she was destined to sing and become a musician.

Album: Written in the Stars 
Mili released her first album Written in the Stars in which she has composed all ten songs on the album and has collaborated with veteran musicians Vinnie Colaiuta, Michael Landau, James Genus and George Whitty. The album was launched with the first video Dream Like A Skylark on YouTube. Written in the Stars was recorded and produced in Los Angeles, California and released under the label Apostrophe Music.

The music video for the song Fooling was filmed in Budapest, Hungary and Stockholm, Sweden and was broadcast on VH1.

Single: Keep The Hope Alive! 
Mili released her first single "Keep The Hope Alive!” on 10 July 2020, which aims at keeping our spirits up, as the whole world is fighting against the pandemic.

Playback Singing in Mainstream Indian Music & Coke Studio@MTV 
A. R. Rahman gave Mili her first break in film music with the Tamil song Keda Kari in Raavanan and Maham Maye in the Telugu film Komaram Puli. Her most recent release is Parakka Seivaai in the Tamil film Ambikapathy, composed by Rahman. She was discovered by Keith Peters while she was performing in Bangalore.

Mili also sang on Meethi Boliyaan in the Hindi film Kai Po Che! for Amit Trivedi. In the hands of Trivedi, Meethi Boliyan evolved into a beautiful composition that infused something new and unconventional in Bollywood music. Impressed by Mili's originality and style, Trivedi incorporated her idea of vocal improvisation in the track which enhanced its fresh appeal. Meethi Boliyaan from Kai Po Che! brought a great response from the listeners and Mili has been acknowledged with award nominations from the Music Industry. She was also a part of Amit Trivedi's concert tours.

Mili has sung and collaborated with director Mahesh Bhatt on the title song for the film Mr. X composed by Jeet Gaanguli.

She has also worked with leading film composer Harris Jayaraj, rendering the Tamil hit Rettai Kathire in Maattrraan .

Mili got recognition and was praised for her performance on Coke Studio Season 2 on MTV when she sang Badari Badariya and Yatra, both composed by Amit Trivedi.

She has sung on major advertisement campaigns, including Seagram's Music, Coca-Cola's Maaza campaign, the Incredible India! Tourism Campaign and Cadbury Silk to name a few. Her international debut performance was in 2009 with jazz guitarist Vinnie Valentino at the Java Jazz Festival in Jakarta.

Discography

Albums

Written in the Stars : Track Listing 
All songs written and composed by Mili.

Release: 15 December 2017
Personnel 
 MILI – Vocals
 Vinnie Colaiuta – Drums
 Michael Landau - Guitars
 James Genus - Bass
 George Whitty - Piano
Also appearing
 Bill Churchville – Trumpet
 Alejandro Carballo - Trombone
 Terry Landry - Tenor & Barritone Saxophone
Composition & Lyrics by MILI
Produced by Hamesh

Singles 

 Keep The Hope Alive! (Acoustic)

Feature films

Coke Studio at MTV India

Awards and nominations

References

External links
 – official site

Mili Keep The Hope Alive - Single Release Press. The New Indian Express - Indulge - India
Mili Written In The Stars - Album Pre Release Press. Deccan Chronicle India ]]
 Times of India, Bangalore Times 2018.
 Singer-songwriter Mili to release 'Fooling' video.

Indian women playback singers
21st-century Indian singers
Bollywood playback singers
Tamil playback singers
Indian jazz singers
Living people
Indian women singer-songwriters
Indian singer-songwriters
21st-century Indian women singers
Indian women jazz singers
Singers from Mumbai
Year of birth missing (living people)